Sun God is the debut studio album by Sun God, released on May 22, 1995, by Fifth Colvmn Records and Original Artists Group.

Music
The songs "Ayizan" and "Guede" from Sun God were released on the various artists compilations Life Is Too Short for Boring Music Volume VII and Forced Cranial Removal by EFA and Fifth Colvmn Records. In 1996 the track "Guede", also from the band's debut, was released on Living for Music 2 by Discordia.

Reception 

John Bush of AllMusic awarded Sun God three out of five stars, calling it an "album of tribal rhythms and percussion" with "Nigiani's airy vocals and Orpheus's sinister growls complementing each other well." Sonic Boom described it as "a modern day interpretation of what many of the early pagan magick ceremonies might have been in the middle ages" and that "the music inspires meditation, celebration and escape from the constraints of society on its listeners."

Track listing

Personnel 
Adapted from the Sun God liner notes.

Sun God
 Marcus Giltjes – instruments, production
 Patricia Nigiani – vocals, instruments, production
 Rodney Orpheus – vocals, instruments, production

Additional performers
 Emily Brayshaw – viola
 Tom Crowe – Gnostic chanting
 Carolina Gross – flute

Production and design
 Axel Ermes – assistant production
 Jürgen Jansen – assistant production

Release history

References

External links 
 

1995 debut albums
Fifth Colvmn Records albums